Alexander Dunbar was a Covenanting field preacher and school teacher. He was imprisoned on the Bass Rock for about a year between 1685 and 1686.

Early life

Alexander Dunbar was born about 1645, the same year as the Battle of Auldearn. He was probably son of John Dunbar, minister of Edinkillie. He graduated from King's College, Aberdeen, with an M.A. in 1661. He was a school master at Auldearn from 1666 to 1670. He became chaplain and tutor at Kilravock.

Ministry
Having completed his student curriculum, he was licensed by a few of the "outed ministers," at Edinburgh, in 1682. He was ordained before 13 July 1678. Immediately, after being licensed, he began preaching which he assiduously carried on until the beginning of 1685, when he was apprehended. The indictment, which was a somewhat serious one, charged him with "keeping conventicles, withdrawing from the ordinances, inculcating seditious doctrine, plotting against the Government, supplying and harbouring rebels, and other public crimes and irregularities." When examined before a Committee of the Privy Council, at Elgin, in the beginning of the year 1685, he admitted that he had not attended the Parish Kirk and had officiated several times in private houses. He also refused to take the oath of allegiance to King James. Dunbar was, therefore, sentenced to penal servitude amid the plantations of the West being banished by the Privy Council 2 March 1685. His transportation, however, never was carried into effect. In lieu thereof, he was conveyed a prisoner to the Bass, in February 1685, where he remained one full year, after which he regained his liberty on the ground of the impaired state of his health.

After the toleration
On 6 July 1687 he was acknowledged by the Presbyterian ministers of Lothian at their first meeting after the Toleration. He was admitted to Auldern in 1689. Dunbar was a member of Assembly in the years 1690 and 1692. He died after an illness of three years, on 29 October 1707. Macdonald said his life and ministry in Auldearn were in thorough consistency with the testimony which he bore for the truth in imprisonment and in bonds. Sir Hugh Campbell of Cawdor refers to him in his book on the Lord's Prayer, as "the holy Mr Alexander Dunbar, minister of Auldearn."
He left 200 merks to provide silver communion cups for the parish.

Family
He married (1) Margaret Meldrum, who died 29 September 1689 and (2) Beatrix Fowler, who survived him.

Bibliography
Wodrow s Hist., iv., 196
Moray Tests. 
Brodie's Diary.

References

17th-century Presbyterian ministers
Covenanters
1707 deaths
Scottish prisoners and detainees
17th-century Ministers of the Church of Scotland
Covenanting Prisoners of the Bass Rock